Fraser Verrusio, was policy director to Alaska US Rep. Don Young (R) and Policy Director for the House Transportation Committee while Rep. Young was chairman. On March 6, 2009, he was indicted for violating federal anti-corruption laws in the long-running Jack Abramoff scandals. He attended Mount Carmel High School from September 1984 to June 1986.

Background
Verrusio was one of the first hires Young made when he took over as chairman of the Transportation Committee in 2001 and was promoted to Policy Director in 2002. He was charged with using his position on the Transportation and Infrastructure Committee to help an equipment rental company secure three amendments in federal highway legislation in exchange for an all-expenses-paid trip to the first game of the 2003 World Series in New York between the Yankees and the Florida Marlins that included a visit to a strip club.

The amendments "would have encouraged public works agencies collecting federal highway money to rent rather than own equipment", according to the indictment. Further, the amendment created incentives for agencies to rent from a leasing company.

The equipment rental conspiracy alleged in the indictment "resulted in guilty pleas from the two Abramoff associates -- Todd Boulanger and James Hirni—and the Senate aide, Trevor Blackann, who at the time worked for Missouri Senator Christopher Bond(R),

Verrusio was found guilty of accepting bribes and perjury for lying about it.  He was sentenced to 1/2 day in jail, 2 years supervised probation and fined $1,000.(2011)

References 

Living people
United States congressional aides
People associated with the Jack Abramoff scandals
American politicians convicted of federal public corruption crimes
Year of birth missing (living people)
 Alaska politicians convicted of crimes